Fredrick Barthelme (born October 10, 1943) is an American novelist and short story writer, well-known as one of the seminal writers of minimalist fiction. Alongside his personal publishing history, his position as Director of The Center For Writers at The University of Southern Mississippi 
and editor of the nationally prominent literary journal Mississippi Review (1977 - 2010) have placed him at the forefront of the contemporary American literary scene. He is currently the editor of New World Writing (formerly Blip Magazine)

Early life
Barthelme was born in Houston, Texas. His father, Donald Barthelme, Sr., was a well-known and highly active Modernist architect in the city. The atmosphere of intellectual and aesthetic vigor encouraged by their father, pervasive in Barthelme family life, is described in Double Down: Reflections on Gambling and Loss, a memoir co-written by Frederick and his brother, Steven. His other brothers, Donald and Steven, emerged from the creative household to become authors as well. Frederick pursued his widely-ranging talents in multiple creative fields, including painting and music. He was a founding member of the avant-garde psychedelic rock band The Red Krayola. He eventually chose to focus on fiction writing: receiving his M.A. in creative writing from Johns Hopkins University, where he studied with John Barth.

Style
Barthelme's works are known for their focus on the landscape of the New South.  Along with his reputation as a minimalist (similar to Raymond Carver, Ann Beattie, Amy Hempel, and Mary Robison), Barthelme's work has also been described by terms such as "dirty realism" and "Kmart realism". He published his first short story in The New Yorker, and has claimed that a rotisserie chicken helped him understand that he needed to write about ordinary people.  He has moved away from the postmodern stylings of his older brother, Donald Barthelme, though his brother's influence can be seen in his earliest works, Rangoon and War and War.

Barthelme was thirty-three-year editor of Mississippi Review, known for recognizing and publishing once new talents such as Larry Brown, Curtis Sittenfeld, and Amy Hempel early in their careers. Issues of Mississippi Review have been guest-edited by authors Rick Moody and Mary Robison among others.

Awards
 1976-77 Eliot Coleman Award for prose from Johns Hopkins University for his short story, "Storyteller."
 1979, 1980 National Endowment for the Arts grant
 2004 PEN/Faulkner Award for Fiction nomination for Elroy Nights.
 2010 Mississippi Institute of Arts and Letters fiction award for Waveland

Bibliography
"Driver", The Barcelona Review

Story Collections
 Rangoon 1970.
 Moon Deluxe Simon & Schuster, 1983.
 Chroma Simon & Schuster, 1987.
 The Law of Averages: New & Selected Stories Counterpoint, 2000.
 "trip" (text) photographs by Susan Lipper Powerhouse Books, 1998.

Novels (fiction)
 War and War 1971.
 Second Marriage New York: Simon & Schuster, 1984.
 Tracer New York: Simon & Schuster, 1985.
 Two Against One New York: Weidenfeld & Nicolson, 1988.
 Natural Selection New York: Viking, 1989.
 The Brothers New York: Viking, 1993.
 Painted Desert New York: Viking, 1995.
 Bob the Gambler Boston: Houghton-Mifflin, 1997.
 Elroy Nights Cambridge: Counterpoint, 2003.
 Waveland New York: Doubleday, 2009.
 There Must Be Some Mistake New York: Little Brown, 2014.

Memoirs (non-fiction)
 (With Steven Barthelme) Double Down: Reflections on Gambling and Loss. Boston: Houghton Mifflin, 1999.

Screenplays
 Second Marriage 1985.
 Tracer 1986.

References

Further reading
Brinkmeyer, Robert H. "Suburban Culture, Imaginative Wonder: The Fiction of Frederick Barthelme." Studies in the Literary Imagination 27 (Fall 1994): 105–1. 
Hughes, John C. The Novels and Short Stories of Frederick Barthelme: A Literary Critical Analysis. Lewiston: Mellen: 2005.  
Peters, Timothy. "The Eighties Pastoral: Frederick Barthelme's Moon Deluxe Ten Years On." Studies in Short Fiction 31.2 (Spring 1994): 175–95.

External links
The author's personal website
"Interview with Frederick Barthelme", Apr 11, 2009 
"More on Frederick Barthelme", The New York Times
""The Web is a gun" An e-mail exchange", The Atlantic
Short Story: "Shopgirls" on Fictionaut
"After Storms Literal and Metaphoric, Rebuilding", NPR

20th-century American novelists
20th-century American male writers
21st-century American novelists
American editors
American male novelists
Johns Hopkins University alumni
Minimalist writers
University of Southern Mississippi faculty
Novelists from Mississippi
1943 births
Living people
American male short story writers
20th-century American short story writers
21st-century American short story writers
PEN/Faulkner Award for Fiction winners
21st-century American male writers
Red Krayola members